Andrew Clark "Drew" Hall is an American former Major League Baseball pitcher with the Chicago Cubs (–), Texas Rangers and Montreal Expos. He was born in Louisville, Kentucky, but grew up in Ashland, Kentucky and attended Paul G. Blazer High School. He then attended Morehead State University. He is most famous for being involved in the Rafael Palmeiro and Mitch Williams trade in 1988. He was used primarily as a relief pitcher and spot starter.

In 1984, Hall was a member of the 30-man Olympic baseball roster. While at training camp for the Olympic team, he signed a contract to play professionally for the Chicago Cubs. The contract allowed him to remain as amateur status until the conclusion of the Olympics.  He is still the highest draft pick by a Major League Baseball team in the state of Kentucky. In the majors, he went 9-12 with a 5.21 earned run average with 148 strikeouts.
 
Hall returned to his alma mater, Morehead State University, in 2008 to serve one year as the pitching coach under Head Coach Jay Sorg. He now works with Kentucky area baseball teams.

External links

1963 births
Living people
American expatriate baseball players in Canada
Baseball coaches from Kentucky
Baseball players from Louisville, Kentucky
Buffalo Bisons (minor league) players
Chicago Cubs players
Colorado Springs Sky Sox players
Iowa Cubs players
Lodi Crushers players
Major League Baseball pitchers
Montreal Expos players
Morehead State Eagles baseball players
Nashville Sounds players
Oklahoma City 89ers players
Paul G. Blazer High School alumni
Pittsfield Cubs players
Scranton/Wilkes-Barre Red Barons players
Sportspeople from Louisville, Kentucky
Texas Rangers players
Toledo Mud Hens players
Winston-Salem Spirits players
Fortitudo Baseball Bologna players
American expatriate baseball players in Italy